Ajaran may refer to:

 Ajaran, Armenia
 Ajaran people, an ethnographic subgroup of Georgians